Keeping the Faith is a 2000 film directed, produced by and starring Edward Norton.

Keeping the Faith may also refer to:
 "Keeping the Faith" (song), a 1983 song by Billy Joel from the album An Innocent Man
 "Keepin' the Faith", a song by De La Soul from the album De La Soul Is Dead
 "Keeping the Faith", a song by Mary Chapin Carpenter from the album A Place in the World
 "Keeping the Faith", a song by Lynyrd Skynyrd from the album Lynyrd Skynyrd 1991
 Keeping the Faith: Stories of Love, Courage, Healing, and Hope from Black America, a book by Tavis Smiley
 Keepin' the Faith, a 1993 album by Steve Laury
 A reference to the Bible, 2 Timothy 4:7, "I have fought a good fight, I have finished my course, I have kept the faith"

See also 
 Keep the Faith (disambiguation)